The North East Cork by-election, 1895 could refer to:
North East Cork by-election, February 1893
North East Cork by-election, June 1893